William Price (born 5 October 1934 in Tarbolton; died 2004) was a footballer who played as a left half for Annbank United, Airdrie, Falkirk, Celtic and Berwick Rangers. He lived most of his life in the town of Ayr near Tarbolton.

Celtic purchased Billy from Falkirk for £1000 in July 1961. He played for Celtic in the 1963 Scottish Cup Final against Rangers, and he played 51 league matches for the club. He ended his career at Berwick Rangers after being released at the end of the 1964–1965 season. He is one of a handful of Scottish footballers that have scored three penalties in one match; he achieved this feat in a game between Falkirk and Hamilton.

External links

Scottish Cup film clip at Pathe

1934 births
2004 deaths
People from Tarbolton
Association football wing halves
Scottish footballers
Airdrieonians F.C. (1878) players
Falkirk F.C. players
Celtic F.C. players
Berwick Rangers F.C. players
Scottish Football League players
Scotland under-23 international footballers
Annbank United F.C. players
Footballers from South Ayrshire